Pitcher is a surname. Notable people with the surname include:

Annabel Pitcher (born 1982), British children's writer
Arthur Pitcher (born 1981), Bermudian cricketer
Azeem Pitcher (born 1980), Bermudian cricketer
Bill Pitcher (1910–1995), British international motorcycle speedway rider 
Darren Pitcher (1969–2018), English former professional footballer
Desmond Pitcher (born 1935), English businessman
Dixon Pitcher, American politician
Duncan Pitcher (1877–1944), British Indian Army and Royal Air Force officer
Ernest Pitcher (1888–1946), English recipient of the Victoria Cross during the First World War
Frank Pitcher (1879–1921), Australian cricketer
Fred B. Pitcher (1867–1924), New York state senator
Freddie Pitcher (born 1967), 12th President of Nauru
Geoff Pitcher (born 1975), English former professional footballer
George Pitcher, British journalist, author, public relations pioneer, and Anglican priest
Harvey Pitcher (born 1936), English writer, historian and translator
Henry William Pitcher (1841–1875), English recipient of the Victoria Cross in India
Justin Pitcher (born 1987), Bermudian cricketer
Moll Pitcher (c.1736–1813), American clairvoyant and fortune-teller
Molly Pitcher, nickname given to a woman said to have fought in the American Revolutionary War
Nathaniel Pitcher (1777–1836), American lawyer and politician, Governor of New York
Oliver Pitcher (born 1983), Bermudian cricketer
Perley A. Pitcher (1877–1939), American lawyer and politician, temporary President of the New York State Senate in 1939
Rebecca Pitcher (born 1972), American actress in the musical theater
Robert Pitcher (born 1964), English former cricketer
Thomas Gamble Pitcher (1824–1895), American soldier
Thomas Pitcher (1745-1837) established a shipyard in Northfleet
Tony J. Pitcher, Canadian fisheries scientist
Wallace Spencer Pitcher (1919–2004), British geologist
William Charles John Pitcher (1858–1925), English artist and costume and scenery designer
Xander Pitchers (born 1994), Namibian cricketer
Zina Pitcher (1797–1872), American physician, politician, educator, and academic administrator